Lloyd Hobart Wood (October 25, 1896 – February 15, 1964) was an American Republican politician from the Commonwealth of Pennsylvania who served as the 20th lieutenant governor of Pennsylvania from 1951 to 1955. He  served in the Pennsylvania State Senate for the 12th district from 1947 to 1951 and in the Pennsylvania House of Representatives for the  Montgomery County district from 1939 to 1946.

Early life and education
Wood was born in Grampian, Pennsylvania, to George L. and Maude (Goss) Wood.  He graduated from Central High School in Winchester Township and received a B.S. degree from Ursinus College and a LL.B from Temple University.

He served as a corporal in the United States Marine Corps in both World War I and World War II.

Career
He worked as attorney-at-law for the Montgomery County Republican Committee and served as a member of the Pennsylvania House of Representatives for the Montgomery County district from 1939 to 1946.  He resigned from the House on February 11, 1946, and served in the Pennsylvania State Senate from 1947 to 1951.

He served as the 20th Lieutenant Governor of Pennsylvania from 1951 to 1955 under Governor John Fine.  He had an unsuccessful campaign for Governor of Pennsylvania in 1955.

He was elected Chief Clerk of the Pennsylvania House of Representatives and served from 1957 to 1959.

He died on February 15, 1964, and is interred at Riverside Cemetery in West Norriton Township, Pennsylvania.

References

External links
The Political Graveyard

|-

|-

1896 births
1964 deaths
20th-century American politicians
United States Marine Corps personnel of World War I
United States Marine Corps personnel of World War II
Burials in Pennsylvania
Lieutenant Governors of Pennsylvania
Republican Party members of the Pennsylvania House of Representatives
Pennsylvania lawyers
Republican Party Pennsylvania state senators
People from Clearfield County, Pennsylvania
Temple University Beasley School of Law alumni
Ursinus College alumni
20th-century American lawyers